The 1998–99 Football League (known as the Nationwide Football League for sponsorship reasons) was the 100th completed season of The Football League.

Sunderland were crowned First Division champions with 105 points, then a record, having lost just three games all season, to prove right the many pundits who tipped them for promotion. The two other promotion places were secured by two of the division's least fancied sides — runners-up Bradford City (back in the top division for the first time in 77 years) and playoff winners Watford (who had won their second successive promotion during Graham Taylor's second spell as manager).

Bury, Oxford United and Bristol City occupied the three relegation places in the First Division. Oxford's dismal season was mainly down to £10 million debts which were putting the club in real danger of closure, and had also resulted in the suspension of construction of their new stadium near the Blackbird Leys estate.

Kevin Keegan completed his spell as Fulham manager before taking the England job by guiding the Cottagers to the Second Division championship with a staggering 101 points. Following them up were runners-up Walsall and playoff winners Manchester City.

Going down were York City, Northampton Town, Lincoln City and Macclesfield Town. Narrowly avoiding the drop to the Third Division were Oldham Athletic, who just five years earlier had been a Premiership side who came within a whisker of reaching the FA Cup final.

Brentford, Cambridge United, Cardiff City and Scunthorpe United occupied the four promotion places in the Third Division.

Carlisle United kept their league status in remarkable fashion. They entered the final game of the season in bottom place, and with 90 minutes on the clock in their home game against Plymouth Argyle they were drawing 1–1 and needed a win to stay up. The referee then allowed 4 minutes of stoppage time and with just seconds to go, goalkeeper Jimmy Glass came upfield and scored from a rebounded corner to preserve his club's place in the league which had been held since 1928. Scarborough, who had only joined the league in 1987, were relegated instead. Glass, 25, had been signed on loan from Swindon Town after the transfer line because an injury crisis had left Carlisle without a goalkeeper for the final few games of the season.

First Division
One season after missing out on promotion in a dramatic playoff final defeat, Sunderland clinched a place in the Premier League after a brilliant season which saw them achieve an English league record of 105 points and clinch the Division One title for the second time in four seasons. Bradford City, in their first full season under the management of Paul Jewell, were the surprise package in Division One this season, finishing runners-up to reach the Premier League and return to the top flight of English football for the first time since 1922. 

In the playoffs, Watford won at Wembley for the first time in their history, beating Bolton Wanderers 2-0 to secure a second successive promotion and end their 11-year absence from the top flight. Birmingham City and Ipswich Town were the beaten semi-finalists in the playoffs.

Wolves manager Mark McGhee was sacked in early November after a disappointing first three months of the season, with his assistant Colin Lee being appointed manager after a successful interim spell in charge, but Wolves were beaten to a playoff place on the last day of the season. Their local rivals West Bromwich Albion finished 12th but their striker Lee Hughes, in only his second season in league football, finished as the highest scorer in all four divisions with 31 Division One strikes. 

New Crystal Palace owner Mark Goldberg's dream to turn the Selhurst Park club into a major force quickly turned into a nightmare as he found himself unable to prevent the club from being crippled by debt, and the team failed to deliver the goods on the pitch. Terry Venables stood down as manager in January, handing over the reins to director of football Steve Coppell, who took charge as manager for the fourth time in 15 years. Coppell guided the Eagles to a 14th place finish in the final table. 

Bristol City's return to Division One ended in relegation after just one season as they finished bottom of the table, joined on the final day by Oxford United and Bury.

Play-offs

First Division results

First Division maps

Second Division
One season after falling in the Division Two playoffs, Fulham established themselves as the pace-setters in the division this season and finished as runaway champions with 101 points. Manager Kevin Keegan accepted the FA's offer to take charge of the England team in February, but remained in charge at Craven Cottage until the end of the season before handing over the reins to Paul Bracewell, leaving Fulham with just one more promotion to win before achieving their goal of a place in the Premier League.

The final promotion place was secured by Manchester City, playing in the third tier for the first time in their history. A frustrating first few months of the season mounted the pressure on manager Joe Royle, but the Maine Road board kept faith in him and rewarded by an upturn in form which saw them finish third in the final table. After overcoming another Greater Manchester club, Wigan Athletic, in the playoff semi-finals, City took on Gillingham in the Wembley final but looked to have surrendered promotion to the Kent side who were still 2-0 up with 90 minutes on the clock. Then came two goals in added time which forced extra time, with City winning on penalties and sealing an instant return to Division One. 

In their final season at Springfield Park, the one time home of the long-defunct Wigan Borough and their own home since formation in 1932, Wigan Athletic clinched the Football League Trophy, some compensation for their subsequent failure in the Division Two playoffs. The other losing semi-finalists in the playoffs were Preston North End, who managed to retain the services of their highly-rated new manager David Moyes despite interest from Manchester United, who were looking to appoint a new assistant manager halfway through the season.

Stoke City, who had frequently led Division Two in the first half of the season, looked all set to return to Division One at the first time of asking, before a slump in the second half of the season dragged them down to seventh in the final table - not even enough for a playoff place. Manager Brian Little left after just one season in charge and was succeeded by Gary Megson. There was similar disappointment for Reading, also newly relegated from Division One, who could only manage a 10th place finish in their first season at the new Madejski Stadium. 

Newly promoted Macclesfield Town and Lincoln City went straight back down to Division Three, and were joined by Northampton Town (playoff finalists the previous season) and a York City side who had rarely been out of the relegation battle during the previous three seasons and finally ran out of luck following the sale of top scorer Richard Cresswell to Sheffield Wednesday in March. Relegation also brought about the end of Alan Little's reign at Bootham Crescent after more than six years at the helm. Oldham Athletic had a lucky escape from relegation in their first season under player-manager Andy Ritchie, with the man whose goals had helped them reach the top flight eight years earlier was faced with the challenge of keeping them out of the league's fourth tier.

Play-offs

Second Division maps

Third Division

Brentford achieved an instant return to Division Two under new chairman-manager Ron Noades, who took them to the Division Three title with 85 points. Cambridge United finally won promotion from Division Three at the fourth time of asking, clinching promotion as runners-up after three successive mid table finishes. The final automatic promotion place was sealed by Cardiff City, who enjoyed a big improvement in form to finish third just 12 months after finishing 21st. Scunthorpe United triumphed over Leyton Orient 1-0 in the playoff final to clinch the fourth and final promotion place, and ending their lengthy spell in the league's fourth tier.

A dramatic final day brought one of the most memorable moments of the season in the battle to stay in the Football League. An injury crisis had forced Carlisle United to bring in Swindon Town goalkeeper Jimmy Glass on loan after the transfer deadline. They went into their final game of the season needing to beat Plymouth Argyle at Brunton Park to stay in the Football League, but the score was still 1-1 with 90 minutes showing on the clock. With only seconds of extra time remaining, Glass ran the full length of the pitch to fire in a late winner to keep Carlisle in the league and relegate Scarborough.

Play-offs

Third Division maps

See also
 1998-99 in English football
 1998 in association football
 1999 in association football

References
The tables above are reproduced here in the exact form that they can be found at The Rec.Sport.Soccer Statistics Foundation website, with home and away statistics separated. Play-off results are from the same website.

 
1998-99
2